Acleris blanda is a species of moth of the family Tortricidae. It is found in Japan (Honshu).

The wingspan is 11–15 mm.

References

Moths described in 1975
blanda
Moths of Japan